Wiegand is a German surname. It originated from the Old High German verb wîgan, meaning to fight, through the past participle form wîgant, meaning the fighter.  The word comes from wîg (battle/war). The name was in use by the Middle Ages, also as a first name.  

People with the name Wiegand or von Wiegand: 

 Charmion Von Wiegand (1896–1983), American journalist and abstract artist
 Clyde Wiegand (1915–1996), American physicist
 Dave Wiegand (1974-), American Scrabble player
 David Wiegand (1947–2018), American journalist and critic
 Ernest H. Wiegand (1886–1973), American scientist
 Frank Wiegand (born 1943), German Olympic medallist in swimming
 Haike Beruriah Wiegand (born 1965), Oxford Lector in Hebrew and Jewish Studies
 Heinrich Wiegand (1855–1909), head of Norddeutscher Lloyd
 Joe Wiegand (born 1965), portrayer of Theodore Roosevelt
 John R. Wiegand
 Wiegand effect
 Wiegand wire
 Wiegand protocol, used in many kinds of card readers, both for Wiegand wire card readers and magnetic stripe card readers
 Karl Henry von Wiegand (1874–1961), German-born American journalist
 Karl McKay Wiegand (1873–1942), American botanist
 Krista E. Wiegand (born 1971), American political scientist
 Lisa Wiegand (born 1968), American cinematographer
 Theodor Wiegand (1864–1936), German archaeologist
 Thomas Wiegand (born 1970), German electrical engineer
 Wayne A. Wiegand (born 1946), American library historian, author, and academic
 William B. Wiegand, pioneer in carbon black technology 
 Dick and Larry Wiegand, members of the rock band Crow

See also
 Weygand, Wigand, Weigand
 Wiegand Island

Surnames from given names